Ruhbergia bifalcata is a species of velvet worm in the family Peripatopsidae. This species has 15 pairs of legs in both sexes. The type locality is in New South Wales, Australia.

References

Further reading

Onychophorans of Australasia
Onychophoran species
Animals described in 1996